Rampla Juniors Fútbol Club, commonly known as Rampla Juniors, is a Uruguayan football club based in Montevideo. The team was actively playing the 2021 season by January 2021. In their home stadium, Rampla won the Uruguayan championship in 1927. In 2019, the Rampla Juniors Fútbol Club had Estadio Olímpico, with 6,000 capacity, as its home stadium. Fans are nicknamed "The Flinstones," as they helped build the team's home stadium in the 1960s, which resembled a quarry.

History

Origin and colours

Rampla Juniors were founded in the Aduana area (also the birthplace of River Plate FC), then moved first to the Aguada neighborhood, and finally, around 1920, to the Cerro neighborhood. Their colors are taken from Fortaleza, a club that existed in the early years of Rampla's stint in the Cerro area. Another story of how they chose their colors is similar to how Boca Juniors supposedly got the idea for their kit colors from a Swedish flag on a ship. It is rumored that Rampla's founders took the red and green from an Italian flag on a ship that arrived in Montevideo Bay. It is also said that the basketball team CA Aguada (founded in 1922) took their colors from Rampla Juniors.

Early championships and games

In their home stadium, Rampla won the Uruguayan championship in 1927. Rampla in 1927 won the Uruguayan Primera División, the 1927 Squad was: Pedro Arispe (Captain), Pedro Aguirre, Enrique Ballestrero, Pedro Cabrera, Julio Nieto, José Magallanes, Juan Miguel Fermín "Ruso" Labraga, Luis Gaitán, Conrado Haeberli, Vital Ruffatti and Conrado Bidegain.

Rampla was once called the third "big" (meaning popular or best) of Uruguay's clubs, Nacional and Peñarol being first and second, due to the huge number of followers and positive results.

In its early days, Rampla Juniors had strong ties with the meat packing industries that forged the neighborhood that it represents, notably the Chicago companies Swift and Armour. From those companies' workforces came several important players to Rampla Juniors. Until the mid 1960s Ramplas' supporters were known as Friyis, as the sound resembled fridges (from the meat packing industries).

Fans are nicknamed "The Flinstones," as they helped build the team's home stadium during the 1964 and 1966 construction, which resembled a quarry. In 1966, the stadium had received its name.

In the 1980s the club replaced the stadium's old wooden stands with new ones made with concrete. Supporters helped break stones for the restoration, hence their new nickname, the Picapiedras (stone breakers).

In 2007, Rampla finished tied in 2nd place with Danubio in the Uruguayan 1st division. Their team record was (9 wins, 4 draws, and 2 losses, in 15 games).

Recent seasons
By 2009, the club was in political and financial difficulties. By 2015, Rampla was in debt around US $200,000. In 2016, trade unionist Juan Castillo was named the club's president, and new management was announced too. Castillo was soon replaced with Isabel Peña as president. In 2020, the club's debts were paid by businessman Edgard Parnas, in exchange for 20% of the club's ownership.

In 2019, the Rampla Juniors Fútbol Club continued to use Estadio Olímpico, with 6,000 capacity, as its home stadium. To play a promotion tournament, in August 2020, the team raised US$180,000 in six days, refinancing 50% of debt with players, and paying the other half to start in the Second Division (Uruguayan Segunda División). By 2020 December, Rampla Juniors beat Racing Club de Montevideo 3-0, and were in the final for promotion in the second division.

The team was actively playing the 2021 season by January 2021. In January 2021 the first final of the Second Professional Division was played between Rampla Juniors and team Sud América. Daniel Bianchi was named new president of the Rampla Juniors on Thursday, February 25, 2021. In June 2021 they played the Atenas de San Carlos, ending in a draw at 1-1. On June 16, 2021, they won against Villa Teresa 1-0, with a goal scored by Pablo Pereira. In July 2021, rival Cerro beat the Rampla Juniors 1-0 at Charrua Stadium, in the Liga de Ascenso Profesional. The game was the Villa classic. In August 2021, the team Peñarol won the final against Rampla 4-1.

Rivalries
Rampla Juniors's archrivals are Cerro, and as such, the second biggest rivalry in the country.

The annual derby between teams is high-profile.

Current squad
Updated 13 July 2021

Out on loan

Notable players

Managers

Titles
Uruguayan Primera División: 1
 1927

Segunda División Uruguay: 3
 1944, 1980, 1992

 Divisional Intermedia: 1
 1921

Other Official Domestic Honours
Torneo Competencia: 2
1950, 1955

Torneo de Copa Alfredo Lois: 1
1969

Torneo Cuadrangular: 1
1953

References

External links

 

 
1914 establishments in Uruguay
Football clubs in Uruguay
Association football clubs established in 1914
Villa del Cerro